William Caldwell Anderson Lawrence was a lawyer and state legislator in Pennsylvania.  He was Speaker of the Pennsylvania House of Representatives from 1859 to 1860. He was a Pennsylvania State Representative from 1857 to 1860.  He graduated from Washington College in Washington, Pennsylvania (now Washington & Jefferson College) in 1852.  He died in 1860.

References

1860 deaths
Pennsylvania lawyers
Washington & Jefferson College alumni
Speakers of the Pennsylvania House of Representatives
Members of the Pennsylvania House of Representatives
Year of birth missing